Jarosławiec may refer to the following places:
Jarosławiec, Poznań County in Greater Poland Voivodeship (west-central Poland)
Jarosławiec, Hrubieszów County in Lublin Voivodeship (east Poland)
Jarosławiec, Zamość County in Lublin Voivodeship (east Poland)
Jarosławiec, Środa Wielkopolska County in Greater Poland Voivodeship (west-central Poland)
Jarosławiec, West Pomeranian Voivodeship (north-west Poland)